Ley-Miro  is a town and sub-prefecture in the Pita Prefecture in the Mamou Region of northern-central Guinea.

References

Sub-prefectures of the Mamou Region